The 2012–13 Lietuvos krepšinio lyga was the 20th season of the top-tier level professional basketball league of Lithuania, the Lietuvos krepšinio lyga (LKL).

Competition format
Every team except Žalgiris and Lietuvos rytas played 22 games, two against each other. Those two teams, due to their participation in EuroLeague, played only eleven games, all of them away.

The eight first qualified teams joined the playoffs. Quarterfinal series were played with a best-of-three series format, semifinals with a best-of-five and the finals with a best-of-seven games format. The last qualified of the Regular Season was relegated to the NKL.

Regular season

Playoffs

Bracket

Quarterfinals

Žalgiris (1) vs. Nevėžis (8)

Lietuvos Rytas (2) vs. Juventus (7)

Prienai (3) vs. Šiauliai (6)

Neptūnas (4) vs. Pieno žvaigždės (5)

Semifinals

Lietuvos Rytas (2) vs. Prienai (3)

Žalgiris (1) vs. Neptūnas (4)

Final

Third Place

Statistics 

Points

Rebounds

Assists

References

External links
 LKL website

 
Lietuvos krepšinio lyga seasons
Lithuanian
LKL